The Tramway de Deauville was a small  narrow gauge tramway system serving the balneary station of Deauville, France.

Inaugurated in 1876, the network consisted of a line stretching Avenue de la République across the town centre. Traction was by horse and transport without concessions. The tram closed in 1905.

References
Les Chemins de Fer Secondaires de France

Deauville
Transport in Normandy
600 mm gauge railways in France